Ksawery Masiuk (born 17 December 2004) is a Polish swimmer. He won a bronze medal at the 19th FINA World Championships in Budapest in 2022, was briefly upgraded to silver after the disqualification of American swimmer Justin Ress and returned to bronze after Ress was reinstated.

References

Polish male swimmers
Living people
2004 births
21st-century Polish people